Chairman Blake House is a historic private home located at Davidson, Mecklenburg County, North Carolina. It was built about 1860, and is a -story, five bay, double pile Greek Revival style frame dwelling with a one-story rear ell. It has steep side gable roof, four brick interior chimneys, and weatherboard sheathing. It features porches on the front and rear facades supported by Tuscan order columns. It was moved to its present location in October 2000. It was the home of Professor John Rennie Blake (1825–1900), who is believed to have occupied the house throughout his tenure at Davidson College, 1861–1885. Today, the home is privately owned.

It was listed on the National Register of Historic Places in 2004.

References

Houses on the National Register of Historic Places in North Carolina
Greek Revival houses in North Carolina
Houses completed in 1860
Houses in Charlotte, North Carolina
National Register of Historic Places in Mecklenburg County, North Carolina